Gare de l'Est – Verdun is a station of the Paris Métro, serving Lines 4, 5, and 7 is located in the 10th arrondissement in Paris, France. It is the fifth busiest station on the network.

Location
The metro station consisting of three lines is located in front of the Gare de l'Est at the intersection of Rue du 8-Mai-1945 and Boulevard de Strasbourg, Line 4 follows a north/south axis and Lines 5 and 7 follow an east / west axis.

History
The station was opened on 15 November 1907 as part of the extension of line 5 from Lancry (now Jacques Bonsergent) to Gare du Nord. The line 4 platforms were opened on 21 April 1908 as part of the first section of the line from Châtelet to Porte de Clignancourt. The line 7 platforms were opened on 5 November 1910 as part of the first section of the line from Opéra to Porte de la Villette. Lines 5 and 7 are parallel, running as four tracks with an island platform with two side platforms. Line 4 runs under 5 and 7 perpendicularly.

The station bears the name of Gare de l'Est, the station under which it is built. Its full name is Gare de l'Est-Verdun, named after the Avenue de Verdun nearby. The name Verdun is in memory of World War I's Battle of Verdun to which French soldiers were sent from the railway station.

From September 2006 to June 2007, Gare de l'Est and its metro station underwent a major renovation thanks to the Gares en mouvement and Un métro + beau projects, to accommodate a more beautiful and modern station the LGV Est line. On the platforms of Lines 5 and 7, orange tiles and blue paint gave way to traditional white tiles. The lights were also replaced, and the latest model of smiley style seating had been installed. Finally, the Parisine typeface replaced the Motte typeface, symbolizing the end of work on the platform. The new standard signage was installed throughout the station.

Only slight changes occurred on the platforms of Line 4. Apart from the replacement of the orange Motte tiles at the ends of the platforms and the passage of a layer of paint on the damaged tile of the vault.

In 2018, it was the fifth busiest metro station in the network, with 21,432,041 million passengers passing through the train station.

Passenger services

Access
The station has eight entrances:
 Access 1: Rue d'Alsace
 Access 2: SNCF Gare de l'Est
 Access 3: Place du 11-Novembre-1918
 Access 4: Rue du Faubourg-Saint-Martin
 Access 5: Rue du 8-Mai-1945
 Access 6: Boulevard de Strasbourg
 Access 7: Landing
 Access 8: Boulevard Magenta

Station layout

Bus and RER connections
The station is served by Lines 31, 32, 35, 38, 39, 46, 56, 91 and the OpenTour tourist line of the RATP Bus Network and, at night, by Lines N01, N02, N13, N14, N41, N42, N43, N44, N45, N140, N141, N142, N143, N144 and N145 of the Noctilian network.

As the name suggests, the metro station is connected to the train station Gare de Paris-Est. The maps for metro Line 7 indicate a connection with the RER E at the Gare de Magenta, although it is necessary to use the public road to reach it. This connection does not appear on the plans of Lines 4 and 5, a direct connection with the RER E can be made at the nearby Gare du Nord.

Gallery

References

Roland, Gérard (2003). Stations de métro. D'Abbesses à Wagram. Éditions Bonneton.

Paris Métro stations in the 10th arrondissement of Paris
Railway stations in France opened in 1908